Ženski košarkaški klub Budućnost Podgorica is a Montenegrin women's basketball team from Podgorica, Montenegro.

ŽKK Budućnost is a part of Budućnost Podgorica sports society.

Names of the club through history
Name of the club that is he wore due to sponsorship reasons:

Honours

Domestic
National Championships – 10

First League of FR Yugoslavia / Serbia and Montenegro:
Winners (2) : 2002, 2003

First A League of Montenegro:
Winners (11) : 2007, 2008, 2012, 2013, 2014, 2015, 2016, 2017, 2018, 2019, 2021
Runners-up (1) : 2009

National Cups – 9

Cup of FR Yugoslavia / Serbia and Montenegro
Runners-up (2) : 2002, 2003

Cup of Montenegro:
Winners (13) : 2007, 2008, 2012, 2013, 2014, 2015, 2016, 2017, 2018, 2019, 2020, 2021, 2022
Runners-up (3) : 2009, 2010, 2011

International
International titles – 5

Reginal Friendly League:
Winners (2) : 2013, 2014

Adriatic League:
Winners (3) : 2016, 2018, 2020
Runners-up (3) : 2019, 2021, 2022

Famous players
  Jelena Dubljević
  Hajdana Radunović
  Jelena Škerović
  Snežana Aleksić
  Iva Perovanović
  Nataša Popović
  Ana Turčinović
  Božica Mujović
  Ana Joković
  Bojana Vulić

See also
 SD Budućnost Podgorica
 KK Budućnost Podgorica

External links
 Profile on eurobasket.com

Women's basketball teams in Montenegro
Women's basketball teams in Yugoslavia
Budućnost Podgorica
KK Budućnost